Massimo Biolcati (born 1972) is a Swedish-Italian-American jazz bassist who is a member of Gilfema and the Lionel Loueke Trio.

Biography
He is a founding member of Gilfema, a trio with Hungarian drummer Ferenc Nemeth and West African guitarist Lionel Loueke that recorded two albums for ObliqSound. The group also recorded three albums for Blue Note as the Lionel Loueke Trio, including Karibu with Wayne Shorter and Herbie Hancock. Hailing from a Swedish/Italian family, Biolcati has toured with Paquito D'Rivera, Terence Blanchard, Ravi Coltrane, Lizz Wright, and Luciana Souza.

Discography

As leader
 Gilfema  (ObliqSound, 2005)
 Gilfema + 2  (ObliqSound, 2008)
 Persona (ObliqSound, 2008)
 Three (Sounderscore, 2020)
 Incontre (Sounderscore, 2020)
 Momenta (Sounderscore, 2021)

As sideman
 Michael Buble, Come Fly with Me (Reprise/143, 2004)
 Angelique Kidjo, Sings (429 Records, 2015)
 Lionel Loueke, Virgin Forest (ObliqSound, 2006)
 Lionel Loueke, Karibu (Blue Note, 2008)
 Lionel Loueke, Mwaliko (Blue Note, 2010)
 Mika Pohjola, Northern Sunrise (Blue Music Group, 2009)
 Matt Slocum, After the Storm (Chandra, 2011)
 Matt Slocum, Black Elk's Dream (Chandra, 2014)
 Luciana Souza, Speaking in Tongues (Sunnyside, 2015)
 Scott Tixier, Brooklyn Bazaar (Sunnyside, 2017)

References

External links
Official website

1972 births
Living people
Jazz double-bassists
21st-century double-bassists
Gilfema members